William Douglas Parker (b. October 31, 1961) is an American businessman who is the Chairman of American Airlines Group, Inc., the parent company of American Airlines Parker previously served as CEO of the airline from 2001 to 2023.

Early life and education 

Parker grew up in Michigan and received a BA in Economics from Albion College (1984).  He then received an MBA from the Owen Graduate School of Management at Vanderbilt University (1986), where American Airlines offered him a job after a campus interview.

Early career 

Parker was a financial analyst at American Airlines from 1986 to 1991, where he was a member of then CEO Robert Crandall's "Brat Pack", alongside Thomas W. Horton (former CEO President and Chairman of American), C. David Cush (former CEO of Virgin America), and Ben Baldanza (former CEO of Spirit Airlines).

Parker joined Northwest Airlines in 1991 and was tasked to help create a team that would systematically figure out where the airline was making and losing money.  Tracking profits flight-by-flight in such detail at that level was a first for Northwest.

Parker became Chief Financial Officer of America West Airlines in 1995 after returning to the United States, and because then-CEO Bill Franke wanted to train him to be a CEO, Parker moved around between finance, sales, and operations. Parker was named Chairman and CEO in September 2001, 10 days before the September 11th terrorist attacks. Under Parker, America West was the first of several airlines to win post-9/11 federal loan guarantees, saving the airline from a second bankruptcy.

US Airways career 

America West and US Airways merged in 2005, with Parker continuing as CEO of the combined company. US Airways made an unsuccessful bid to merge with Delta Air Lines as it was in bankruptcy protection in 2006, faltering as Delta rallied workers and creditors against the hostile bid.  Creditors rejected the bid in early 2007. US Airways also attempted a merger with United Airlines in 2008 and in 2010, but United ultimately merged with Continental Airlines.

American Airlines career 

In 2012, US Airways launched an effort to merge with American Airlines, while American's parent company, AMR Corporation, was in bankruptcy protection. US Airways took the unprecedented step of securing tentative contracts with American's labor groups, while AMR was still pushing to exit bankruptcy. That deal closed on 9 December 2013, and Parker was named CEO of the combined company, which became the world's largest airline. December 7, 2021, American Airlines Group announced Doug Parker will be retiring as the chief executive officer on March 31, 2022 while he will continue to be the chairman of American’s board. Robert Isom, the former president of American is now the new CEO.

Personal life 

Parker lives in Dallas, Texas. He is married to Gwen Parker, and has three children. In 2007, Doug Parker pleaded guilty to his third DUI and was sentenced to 1 day in jail. After his conviction, shareholders questioned if the company should have disclosed Parker's two previous DUI arrests. He and his family are active members of Highland Park United Methodist Church.

Parker endorsed Democratic candidate Hillary Clinton in the run-up for the 2016 U.S. presidential election. Additionally, in 2019, Parker donated $2,500 to Democrat Steny Hoyer.

Awards and appearances 

 2015 Ernst & Young Entrepreneur of the Year, Southwest region.
 Commencement address at Vanderbilt's Owen Graduate School of Management, 10 May 2013
 Recipient of the 2017 Tony Jannus Award for distinguished achievement in commercial air transportation.

References

External links

 Doug Parker Corporate Biography  Pdf 

Albion College alumni
America West Holdings
American airline chief executives
American Airlines people
American chief financial officers
American chief operating officers
Living people
US Airways Group
Vanderbilt University alumni
1962 births